The 2000 CONMEBOL Pre-Olympic Tournament began on 19 January 2000 and was the 11th CONMEBOL Pre-Olympic Tournament. This was the 3rd tournament open to players under the age of 23 without any other restriction. There was no qualification stage and all 10 members of CONMEBOL automatically qualified. The winner and the runner-up qualified for 2000 Summer Olympics. Players born on or after 1 January 1977 were eligible to play in this competition.

Squads

Group A

Group B

Final Group

References

External links
Olympic qualifying 2000 South America

CONMEBOL Pre-Olympic Tournament
CONMEBOL competitions
Football qualification for the 2000 Summer Olympics
CONMEBOL Men